Barnen i Höjden ("The Children on The Height") was the Sveriges Television's Christmas calendar and Sveriges Radio's Christmas Calendar in 1972. The radio version was called När sagan blommade ("When the Fairytale Blossomed").

Plot 
The series is set inside a 24-store highrise apartment building, "Höjden".

DVD 
The series was released to DVD on 23 October 2013.

References

External links 
 
 

1972 radio programme debuts
1972 radio programme endings
1972 Swedish television series debuts
1972 Swedish television series endings
Sveriges Radio's Christmas Calendar
Sveriges Television's Christmas calendar